Thomas Gildea (born September 1939) is a former Irish politician who was elected as an Independent Teachta Dála (TD) at the 1997 general election.

A farmer representing Donegal South-West, he won popular local support for his campaign to legalise 'deflectors' which re-transmitted British television channels in rural areas, but which had been shut down in the wake of legal action by cable and MMDS operators.

In the 1999 local elections, he was elected as a member of Donegal County Council for Glenties. He did not contest the 2002 general election and retired from politics at the 2004 local elections.

He was later Chairman of the National Community Television Association.

References

1939 births
Living people
Independent TDs
Irish farmers
Local councillors in County Donegal
Members of the 28th Dáil
People from Glenties
Politicians from County Donegal
Television in the Republic of Ireland